Keyan Gray Tomaselli is a South African communication professor and author, currently Professor Emeritus and Fellow at University of KwaZulu-Natal, where he established and operated its Centre for Communication, Media and Society for 29 years until becoming a Distinguished Professor of Humanities at University of Johannesburg. He is also editor of the UKZN-UJ journal Critical Arts: South-North Cultural and Media Studies and co-editor at UJ's journal Journal of African Cinemas. He is also a published author and has been largely collected by libraries.

Besides his more conventional media studies activities, Prof Tomaselli participated in several field trips among the Kalahari San people.

References

Academic staff of the University of KwaZulu-Natal
1948 births
20th-century South African historians
South African writers
Academic staff of the University of Johannesburg
Living people